Zdeslava is a female first name of Slavic origin, which means famous here. Another variant is Zdislava.

Short forms include:
 Zdenka, Zdiška, Iška, Slávka, Slava, Zdesa, Zdesha

Bearers of name Zdeslava or Zdislava include:
 Zdislava Berka, a Bohemian saint

Slavic feminine given names
Czech feminine given names